A Course in Miracles (also referred to as ACIM or the Course) is a 1976 book by Helen Schucman. The underlying premise is that the greatest "miracle" is the act of simply gaining a full "awareness of love's presence" in a person's life. Schucman said that the book had been dictated to her, word for word, via a process of "inner dictation" from Jesus Christ. The book is considered to have borrowed from New Age movement writings.

ACIM consists of three sections: "Text", "Workbook for Students", and "Manual for Teachers". Written from 1965 to 1972, some distribution occurred via photocopies before a hardcover edition was published in 1976 by the Foundation for Inner Peace. The copyright and trademarks, which had been held by two foundations, were revoked in 2004 after lengthy litigation because the earliest versions had been circulated without a copyright notice.

Throughout the 1980s, annual sales of the book steadily increased each year; however, the largest growth in sales occurred in 1992 after Marianne Williamson discussed the book on The Oprah Winfrey Show, with more than two million volumes sold. The book has been called everything from "New Age psychobabble" to "a Satanic seduction" to "The New Age Bible". According to Olav Hammer, the psychiatrist and author Gerald G. Jampolsky was among the most effective promoters of ACIM. Jampolsky's first book, Love is Letting Go of Fear, which is based on the principles of ACIM, was published in 1979 and, after being endorsed on Johnny Carson's show, went on to sell over three million copies by 1990.

Origins
A Course in Miracles was written as a collaborative venture between Schucman and William ("Bill") Thetford. In 1958, Schucman began her professional career at Columbia-Presbyterian Medical Center in New York City as Thetford's research associate. In 1965, at a time when their weekly office meetings had become so contentious that they both dreaded them, Thetford suggested to Schucman that "[t]here must be another way". Schucman believed that this interaction acted as a stimulus, triggering a series of inner experiences that were understood by her as visions, dreams, and heightened imagery, along with an "inner voice" which she identified as Jesus (although the ACIM text itself never explicitly claims that the voice she hears speaking is the voice of Jesus). She said that on October 21, 1965, an "inner voice" told her: "This is a Course in Miracles, please take notes." Schucman said that the writing made her very uncomfortable, though it never seriously occurred to her to stop. The next day, she explained the events of her "note-taking" to Thetford. To her surprise, Thetford encouraged her to continue the process. He also offered to assist her in typing out her notes as she read them to him. The process continued the next day and repeated itself regularly for many years. In 1972, the writing of the three main sections of ACIM was completed, with some additional minor writing coming after that point.

For copyright purposes, US courts determined that the author of the text was Schucman, not Jesus. Kenneth Wapnick believed that Schucman did not channel Jesus, but was describing her "own mental experience of divine 'love'".

Reception
Since it went on sale in 1976, the text has been translated into 27 languages. The book is distributed globally, spawning a range of organized groups.

Wapnick said that "if the Bible were considered literally true, then (from a Biblical literalist's viewpoint) the Course would have to be viewed as demonically inspired". He also declared "I often taught in the context of the Bible, even though it is obvious to serious students of A Course in Miracles that it and the Bible are fundamentally incompatible." "Course-teachers Robert Perry, Greg Mackie, and Allen Watson" disagreed about that. Though a friend of Schucman, Thetford, and Wapnick, Catholic priest Benedict Groeschel criticized ACIM and related organizations. Finding some elements of ACIM to be "severe and potentially dangerous distortions of Christian theology", he wrote that it is "a good example of a false revelation" and that it has "become a spiritual menace to many". The evangelical editor Elliot Miller says that Christian terminology employed in ACIM is "thoroughly redefined" to resemble New Age teachings. Other Christian critics say that ACIM is "intensely anti-biblical" and incompatible with Christianity, blurring the distinction between creator and created and forcefully supporting the occult and New Age worldview.

Olav Hammer locates A Course in Miracles in the tradition of channeled works from those of Madam Blavatsky through to the works of Rudolf Steiner and notes the close parallels between Christian Science and the teachings of the Course. Hammer called it "gnosticizing beliefs". In "'Knowledge is Truth': A Course in Miracles as Neo-Gnostic Scripture" in Gnosis: Journal of Gnostic Studies, Simon J. Joseph outlines the relationship between the Course and Gnostic thinking. Daren Kemp also considers ACIM to be neo-Gnostic and agrees with Hammer that it is a channeled text. The course has been viewed as a way which "integrates a psychological world view with a universal spiritual perspective" and linked to transpersonal psychology.

Joseph declared: 

The Skeptic's Dictionary describes ACIM as "a minor industry" that is overly commercialized and characterizes it as "Christianity improved". Robert T. Carroll wrote that the teachings are not original but are culled from "various sources, east, and west". He adds that it has gained increased popularity as New Age spirituality writer Marianne Williamson promoted a variant.

Associated works
Two works have been described as extensions of A Course in Miracles, Gary Renard's 2003 The Disappearance of the Universe and Marianne Williamson's A Return to Love published in 1992. The Disappearance of the Universe, published in 2003 by Fearless Books, was republished by Hay House in 2004. Publishers Weekly reported that Renard's examination of A Course in Miracles influenced his book.

See also 

 Copyright on religious works

References

External links

 
 Editions in public domain:
 
 Urtext Edition – Published by Miracles in Action Press
 Sparkly Edition – Published by Diamond Clear Vision
 Why A Course in Miracles Is Not Good For You, or Those You Love - An open letter from Matthew Remski, investigative journalist on spirituality & cult

 
1976 non-fiction books
Channelled texts
Christian mysticism
Books about Christianity
New Age books
New Thought literature
Nondualism
Unity Church